Long Lake Dam is a concrete gravity dam on the Spokane River, between Lincoln County and Stevens County about  northwest of Spokane in eastern Washington. The dam was built by Washington Water Power (now Avista Utilities), which operates five other dams along the Spokane.

Upon its completion in 1915, Long Lake Dam completely blocked salmon migrations to the upper portions of the Spokane River watershed, although much larger Grand Coulee Dam on the Columbia River extirpated salmon from the entire Spokane basin by 1942.

Hydroelectric Power Plant
The Long Lake Hydroelectric Power Plant was also built in 1915. It was listed on the National Register of Historic Places in 1988.

It was built by the Washington Water Power Co.

See also

List of dams in the Columbia River watershed
Little Falls Hydroelectric Power Plant, also built by the Washington Water Power Co. on the Spokane River and NRHP-listed

References

External links
Historic American Engineering Record (HAER) documentation, filed under Ford, Stevens County, WA:

Buildings and structures in Lincoln County, Washington
Buildings and structures in Stevens County, Washington
Historic American Engineering Record in Washington (state)
Hydroelectric power plants in Washington (state)
United States power company dams
Dams on the National Register of Historic Places in Washington (state)
Dams completed in 1915
Energy infrastructure completed in 1915
Dams on the Spokane River
National Register of Historic Places in Lincoln County, Washington
National Register of Historic Places in Stevens County, Washington